Loch Mealt is an inland fresh-water loch on the Isle of Skye in Scotland. It lies close to Ellishadder and south of Staffin, on the eastern side of the Trotternish peninsula.

Geography
This roughly square-shaped loch is about 1 km in length. Kilt Rock boasts a dramatic waterfall created from the outflow of Loch Mealt.

Ecology
There are a number of bird species in this roadside loch.Its waters are favoured by diving ducks.

The Orkney charr (Salvelinus inframundus), a char  species that could be vulnerable to extinction, has been found in Loch Mealt. Since the impact of Canadian Arctic char the lake upon the native char population is unknown and the taxonomic identity of the char deemed as Salvelinus inframundus is lacking essential information, a full IUCN Red List assessment cannot be made.

See also
List of lochs in Scotland

References

External links

NG5065 : Dun Grianan, broch, Loch Mealt, Skye

Mealt
Mealt
Waterfalls of Scotland